Božidar Ćosić (born 25 July 1982) is a former Serbian professional footballer.

Born in Šabac, SR Serbia, he played with FK Železnik in the First League of Serbia and Montenegro, with FC Khimki in Russian second level, with FK Modriča in the Bosnian Premier League, and with Debreceni VSC in Nemzeti Bajnokság I. In 2009, he moved to Romania where he played for numeros clubs in the Liga II.

References

External links
 Profile at Playerhistory

Living people
1982 births
Sportspeople from Šabac
Serbian footballers
Serbian expatriate footballers
FC Utrecht players
Expatriate footballers in the Netherlands
KFC Uerdingen 05 players
Expatriate footballers in Germany
FC Khimki players
Expatriate footballers in Russia
FK Železnik players
FK Loznica players
FK Mačva Šabac players
FK Zemun players
FK Modriča players
Debreceni VSC players
CS Concordia Chiajna players
Expatriate footballers in Hungary
Association football defenders
CS Turnu Severin players